Buvik is a former municipality in the old Sør-Trøndelag county, Norway. Buvik existed from 1855 until 1965.  The municipality encompassed the extreme northeastern part of what is now the municipality of Skaun in Trøndelag county.  It encompassed the roughly  area surrounding the Vigda river south of the Gaulosen fjord.  The administrative centre was located in the village of Buvika.

History

The municipality was established in 1855 when it split off from the larger municipality of Byneset. Initially, Buvik had a population of 841. During the 1960s, there were many municipal mergers across Norway due to the work of the Schei Committee. On 1 January 1964, the Langørgen farm area (population: 11) was merged into the neighboring municipality of Melhus.  Then, on 1 January 1965, the rest of Buvik (population: 1,267) was merged with the neighboring municipalities of Børsa and Skaun to form a new, larger municipality of Skaun.

Name
The municipality (originally the parish) is named after the Buvik inlet, a small bay located on a southern branch of the main Trondheimsfjorden. Historically, the name was spelled , using the definite singular form of the word.

Government
While it existed, this municipality was responsible for primary education (through 10th grade), outpatient health services, senior citizen services, unemployment, social services, zoning, economic development, and municipal roads. During its existence, this municipality was governed by a municipal council of elected representatives, which in turn elected a mayor.

Mayors
The mayors of Buvik:

 1848–1856: Erik Walseth
 1857-1857: Claus J. Huusby
 1858–1861: Jens Christian Walseth
 1862–1863: John T. Saltnes
 1864–1871: Ole Larsen Huseby
 1872–1875: Jens Christian Walseth
 1876–1883: Ole Larsen Huseby
 1884–1901: Arnt Einum (V)
 1902–1904: Alt Evensen Onsøien (V)
 1905–1916: John Saltnessand (V)
 1917–1922: Erik Huseby (V)
 1923–1925: Ole O. Krogstad (V)
 1926–1932: John Lereggen (Bp)
 1932–1934: Ola Olstad (Bp)
 1935–1941: Elling Svange (Bp)
 1942–1945: Anders Presthus (NS)
 1945-1945: Elling Svange (Bp)
 1946–1947: Fredrik Hammer (Ap)
 1948–1950: Johan Snøfugl (Bp)
 1950–1951: Anders Grøthe (V)
 1951-1951: Gisle Overskott (Bp)
 1952–1964: Fredrik Hammer (Ap)

Municipal council
The municipal council  of Buvik was made up of representatives that were elected to four year terms. The party breakdown of the final municipal council was as follows:

References

Skaun
Former municipalities of Norway
1855 establishments in Norway
1965 disestablishments in Norway